Battswood AFC is a South African football (soccer) club based in Cape Town that currently competes in the Super League First Division.

History
The teachers and students of the Battswood Training College formed the Battswood Football Club in 1929. Initially called the "Battswood Collegians", the club joined the newly established Cape District Football Association as one of its founder member clubs.

In 1959, the club gained eleven trophies, and in 1964 the club won the prestigious Maggot Trophy competition, the highest knockout competition in the Western Province. In 1965, the club lost in the self-same competition in the semi-finals, against the eventual winners, after three replays. In 1966 and 1968, the club lost in the final – in each match, the team was beaten by Woodside.

Due to political policy, the Cape District Football Union was suspended from the Western Province Football Board from 1978 until 1980.

Professional ranks
In 1989, the club turned professional, joining the South African Federation Professional League (FPL). In the first season, the club won the League, Knock-Out Cup (Osman’s Spice Trophy) and the NRB Cup, plus several individual awards. In 1990, the club again won the NRB Cup, and ended up as runners-up in the League, losing in the semi-finals of the Knock-Out Cup to the eventual winners, Santos.

In 1991, with huge political changes starting to take place in the country and with sports becoming unified, a major decision by the Federation Professional League meant that Battswood had to compete in the NSL 1st Division (Coastal League). The club just missed promotion, losing out to Cape Town Spurs.

References

External links
Club Website

Association football clubs established in 1929
SAFA Second Division clubs
Soccer clubs in Cape Town
Soccer clubs in the Western Cape
1929 establishments in South Africa